Mocis incurvalis is a species of moth of the family Erebidae. It is found on the Galápagos Islands.

References

Moths described in 1923
Mocis
Moths of the Caribbean